"Heartland" is a song by rock band U2. It is included on their 1988 album Rattle and Hum and in the film of the same name.

Details 
"Heartland" originated from a trip that bassist Adam Clayton and lead singer Bono made. Bono claimed the song is full of little bits of travelogue from his journal.

The band began writing "Heartland" in 1984 during The Unforgettable Fire sessions, and it was worked on again during The Joshua Tree sessions.

It is the thirteenth track on their 1988 album Rattle and Hum, and was included in the film of the same name.

"Heartland" is the only track from the album not performed in concert on the Lovetown Tour, which began almost a year after Rattle and Hum''s release.

Personnel

U2 
 Bono – lead vocals
 The Edge – guitar, keyboards, backing vocals
 Adam Clayton – bass guitar
 Larry Mullen Jr. – drums, percussion

Additional musicians 
 Brian Eno – keyboards

References 

U2 songs
1988 songs
Song recordings produced by Jimmy Iovine
Songs written by Bono
Songs written by Adam Clayton
Songs written by the Edge
Songs written by Larry Mullen Jr.